Leslie Copeland may refer to:

Les C. Copeland (1887–1942), American composer
Leslie Copeland (athlete) (born 1988), Fijian javelin thrower